The 1978 Svenska Cupen final took place on 4 November 1978 at Strandängens IP in Bromölla. The match was contested by Allsvenskan sides Malmö FF and Kalmar FF. Kalmar FF played their first cup final ever, Malmö FF played their first final since 1975 and their 12th final in total. Malmö FF won their 10th title with a 2–0 victory after extra time.

Match details

External links
Svenska Cupen at svenskfotboll.se

1978
Cupen
Malmö FF matches
Kalmar FF matches
November 1978 sports events in Europe
20th century in Skåne County